Rubén Bonifaz Nuño (12 November 1923 – 31 January 2013) was a Mexican poet and classical scholar.

Born in Córdoba, Veracruz, he studied law at the National Autonomous University of Mexico (UNAM) from 1934 to 1947. In 1960, he began lecturing in Latin at the UNAM's Faculty of Philosophy and Literature and received a doctorate in Classics in 1970. Among his publications are translations of works by Catullus, Propertius, Ovid, Lucretius and others into Spanish; his translation of Vergil's Aeneid (1972–73) was particularly well received.

He was a member of the Mexican Academy of Language since 1963 and was admitted to the Colegio Nacional in 1972.

Selected works
 El Ala del Tigre, Fondo de Cultura Económica (1969) 
 Del Templo de Su Cuerpo, Fondo de Cultura Económica (1993) 
 De Otro Modo, lo Mismo, Fondo de Cultura Económica (1996) 
 Fuego de Pobres, Fondo de Cultura Económica (2000) 
 Los Demonios y los Días, Fondo de Cultura Económica (2010) 
 El Honor del Peligro, Valparaíso (2013)

References

External links
Rubén Bonifaz Nuño (El Colegio Nacional)
Rubén Bonifaz Nuño: Brief biography 
Rubén Bonifaz Nuño: Interview, biography, criticism, poetry 
Rubén Bonifaz Nuño: Selected poetry 

Mexican male poets
1923 births
2013 deaths
National Autonomous University of Mexico alumni
Mexican translators
Members of the Mexican Academy of Language
Members of El Colegio Nacional (Mexico)
20th-century Mexican poets
20th-century translators
20th-century Mexican male writers